The Yes Man is a 1991 Italian drama film directed by Daniele Luchetti. It was entered into the 1991 Cannes Film Festival.

Cast
 Silvio Orlando - Luciano Sandulli
 Nanni Moretti - Cesare Botero
 Giulio Brogi - Francesco Sanna
 Anne Roussel - Juliette
 Angela Finocchiaro - Irene
 Graziano Giusti - Sebastiano Tramonti
 Lucio Allocca - Remo Gola
 Dario Cantarelli - Carissimi
 Antonio Petrocelli - Polline
 Gianna Paola Scaffidi - Adriana
 Giulio Base - Autista di Botero
 Guido Alberti - Carlo Sperati
 Renato Carpentieri - Sartorio
 Silvia Cohen - Botero's wife (as Silva Cohen)
 Roberto De Francesco - Zollo
 Dino Valdi - Federico Castri

References

External links

1991 films
Italian drama films
1990s Italian-language films
1991 drama films
Films directed by Daniele Luchetti
Political drama films
1990s Italian films